Bobby Charles Wilks (May 12, 1931 – July 13, 2009), was an American Coast Guard aviator. He was the first African American Coast Guard aviator and the first African American to reach the rank of Coast Guard captain. Captain Wilks, who also was the first African American to command a Coast Guard air station, was involved in a number of air-sea rescues around the world. He received the Air Medal for his actions on the night of December 9, 1971, while piloting his helicopter over the Pacific Ocean.

Early life and education
Wilks was born  May 12, 1931, in St. Louis, Missouri. He attended Stowe Teachers College (now Harris-Stowe State University) in St. Louis for two years, and then he was accepted into the Naval Academy at Annapolis. He attended the Academy 1950–51 and then returned to Stowe, where he received his undergraduate degree. He later was awarded a master's degree in education from St. Louis University in 1954.

Coast Guard career

Bobby Wilks joined the Coast Guard Reserve in 1955 and received his commission at Officer Candidate School in New London. He was accepted to flight school and subsequently served in San Francisco, the Philippines, Brooklyn, New York, and other duty stations. He attended flight school at Pensacola and received further training at Naval Air Station Corpus Christi from 1956 to 1957, earning his wings on 25 March 1957. He was designated as Coast Guard Aviator Number 735. He qualified for helicopters in 1959 and became Coast Guard Helicopter Pilot Number 343. He transferred to the Regular Coast Guard in 1960 with the permanent rank of lieutenant.

Captain Wilks saw distinguished service at many Coast Guard Air Stations during his career, including oversea tours of duty at Coast Guard Air Detachment Sangley Point, Philippines and at Naples, Italy. He participated in many search-and-rescue cases, including one in which he earned the Air Medal. He was promoted to the rank of captain in 1977 and two years later assumed the command of Coast Guard Air Station Brooklyn.

Captain Wilks retired from the Coast Guard in 1986 with over 6,000 flight hours in 21 different types of aircraft. During his career he established a number of "firsts", including:

 First African American aviator in the Coast Guard
 First African American Coast Guardsman to make the rank of Captain
 First African American Coast Guardsman to command an Air Station

Another of his important contributions to the Coast Guard was his service as a mentor for younger African-American Coast Guardsmen, many of whom have noted the positive impact Captain Wilks had on their careers.

Death

Captain Wilks died on July 13, 2009, at Emeritus at Lake Ridge, in Woodbridge, Virginia. He was inurned at Arlington National Cemetery on September 29, 2009.

References

External links

Captain Bobby Wilks – A historically significant aviator remembered as inspiration — Coast Guard News
 Historically significant aviator remembered as inspiration — U.S. Coast Guard

1931 births
2009 deaths
Aviators from Missouri
Burials at Arlington National Cemetery
Harris–Stowe State University alumni
Military personnel from St. Louis
Recipients of the Air Medal
Saint Louis University alumni
United States Coast Guard captains
United States Naval Academy alumni